This is a list of theatres and live performance venues in San Francisco, California. For more information on theater in San Francisco, see Culture of San Francisco - Theater.

Theatres in San Francisco 

Alcazar Theatre - 511-seat theater at 650 Geary Street 
Balancoire - restaurant/bar/club with live performances, 22nd and Mission Streets in the Mission
Bayview Opera House - includes a 300-seat theater; at 4705 Third Street
Beverly Hills Playhouse of San Francisco - theater and acting school at 414 Mason Street, Suite 502 in Union Square
Bill Graham Civic Auditorium - seats 7000, at 99 Grove Street in the San Francisco Civic Center
Bimbo's 365 Club - music venue at 1025 Columbus Avenue
Bindlestiff Studio - 80-seat Filipino American performing arts center at 185 6th Street
Bottom of the Hill - music venue at 1233 17th Street
Brava Theatre Center - 360-seat Main Stage and 60-seat Second Stage dedicated to "the artistic expression of women, people of color, youth, LGBTQ and other unheard voices," at 2781 24th Street in the Mission
Brick and Mortar - music venue at 1710 Mission Street @ Duboce
Cartwright Hotel on Union Square - hosts Magian Productions in the 80-seat Pacific Heights Room, 524 Sutter Street 
Castro Theatre - 1400 seats, primarily a movie house, but also used for live special events, at 429 Castro Street
Center for Sex & Culture - hosts live theater and other events, 1349 Mission Street South of Market
Chancellor Hotel Theatre - hosts the San Francisco Magic Parlor at 433 Powell Street
The Chapel - music venue at 777 Valencia Street in the Mission
Children's Creativity Museum Theater (formerly Zeum Theater) - a 200-seat theater located in Yerba Buena Gardens, across from the Moscone Convention Center
Club Fugazi - 400-seat theater and nightclub at 678 Green Street that hosted Beach Blanket Babylon
Cobb's Comedy Club - 915 Columbus Avenue
CounterPULSE - 80 Turk Street, previously at 1310 Mission Street
Custom Made Theatre - Intimate modern plays and musicals. 533 Sutter St - 99-seat theatre. </ref>
Curran Theatre - off Union Square; built in 1922
Dance Mission Theater - 3316 24th Street in the Mission
The Dark Room Theatre - small theatre and event space in the Mission; 2263 Mission Street
Diego Rivera Theatre at City College of San Francisco - home of the mural Pan American Unity by Diego Rivera; 50 Phelan Avenue
EXIT Theatre - an alternative theater in the downtown Tenderloin neighborhood; 156 Eddy Street
Feinstein's at the Nikko - 222 Mason Street
Fillmore Auditorium - historic music venue at Fillmore and Geary in the Western Addition
Fort Mason Center - former military base now housing the following theatres:
Bayfront Theatre - home of BATS Improv
Cowell Theatre - 437 seats 
Magic Theatre - 159 seats 
Southside Theatre - 160 seats 
Gateway Theatre (formerly the Eureka Theatre) - home venue for 42nd Street Moon, and frequent venue for the LGBT company Theatre Rhinoceros; 215 Jackson Street
Geary Theatre - home of American Conservatory Theater company; 415 Geary Street
Golden Gate Theatre - in the Tenderloin; built in 1922; once housed vaudeville acts; owned by SHN
Gough Street Playhouse - 50-seat home of the Custom Made Theatre Co.; 1620 Gough Street
Grace Cathedral - hosts concerts
Great American Music Hall - historic concert hall at 859 O'Farrell Street
Great Star Theater - former movie theater, now used for live performances; 636 Jackson Street in Chinatown
Gray Area Foundation for the Arts / Grand Theater - former movie theater, now used for live performances; 
2665 Mission Street, previously 55 Taylor Street, and 923 Market Street
The Hypnodrome - 575 10th Street
Imperial Palace - restaurant featuring weekend production Tony n' Tina's Wedding; 818 Washington Street in Chinatown
Independent - music venue at 628 Divisadero @ Grove
Inner Mission - theater and event space at 2050 Bryant Street in the Mission, home of Theater MadCap
Intersection for the Arts - established in 1965; the oldest alternative non-profit art space in San Francisco; new facility at 925 Mission Street
Kelly Cullen Community Auditorium - historic theater at 220 Golden Gate Avenue; hosts productions by Theater of Others
Lorraine Hansberry Theatre - African-American theatre in downtown San Francisco
Marines Memorial Theater - 609 Sutter Street
Market Street Cinema - 1077 Market Street (closed)
Marrakech Magic Theatre - featuring the magic of Peter Morrison; 419 O'Farrell Street 
The Marsh San Francisco MainStage Theatre - specializes in developing new performance; 1062 Valencia Street in the Mission District
Mission Cultural Center for Latino Arts - includes a 150-seat theater; 2868 Mission Street in the Mission 
Mojo Theatre - theater in the Redstone Building, 2940 16th Street in the Mission
New Conservatory Theatre Center - nonprofit theater company located at 25 Van Ness Avenue
New Mission Theater - movie theater at 2550 Mission Street
New Musical Theater of San Francisco, Inc. - a non-profit corporation that produces original musicals
New People Theater - 1746 Post Street 
Nob Hill Masonic Center - also known as the Masonic Temple or Masonic Auditorium, located at 1111 California Street
Nourse Theater - temporary home of City Arts and Lectures; 1693-seat venue at 275 Hayes Street, Civic Center; reopened for lectures and performances in 2013 after a 61-year hiatus
OASIS - drag theater and cabaret; 298 11th Street, south of Market
ODC Theater - 351 Shotwell Street in the Mission District
Orpheum Theatre - in the Tenderloin; built in 1926; Spanish imperial architecture;  SF historical landmark; owned by SHN
Palace of Fine Arts Theatre - 3301 Lyon Street; originally constructed for the 1915 Panama-Pacific Exposition, has since been rebuilt, renovated and seismically retrofitted
Pena Pachamama - 1630 Powell Street
Phoenix Theatre - two stages: 6th floor theatre and the Annex, at 414 Mason Street
PianoFight - 144 Taylor Street
Presidio Theatre - 99 Moraga Avenue
Project Artaud - arts complex and community in the Mission District; includes the following theatres: 
Joe Goode Annex - performance space for the Joe Goode Performance Group; 401 Alabama Street
NOHSpace - host of Theatre of Yugen, 2840 Mariposa Street
Z Space - home of the theatre company of the same name, with a main stage and the smaller Z Below theater; 450 Florida Street
Punch Line - comedy club at 444 Battery Street
Regency Center - major concert venue at 1290 Sutter Street
Royce Gallery - historic warehouse performance venue at 2901 Mariposa Street in the Mission
Ruby Skye - nightclub and special events venue, formerly the Stage Door Theatre; 420 Mason Street in the Tenderloin
SAFEhouseARTS - dance and theater venue at 1 Grove
San Francisco Conservatory of Music - includes three performance halls (Concert Hall, Recital Hall, and Osher Salon), at 50 Oak Street (Civic Center)
San Francisco Jazz Center - new jazz center at 201 Franklin Street
San Francisco Mime Troupe - traveling theater company that performs political musicals
San Francisco Playhouse - 199-seat non-profit theater at 450 Post Street in Union Square
San Francisco War Memorial and Performing Arts Center - complex of large performance spaces in the Civic Center area on Van Ness Avenue which includes the following venues:
Herbst Theatre - 401 Van Ness in the San Francisco Civic Center
Louise M. Davies Symphony Hall - 201 Van Ness - home of the San Francisco Symphony
War Memorial Opera House - 301 Van Ness, across from City Hall - home of the San Francisco Opera and San Francisco Ballet
South of Market Cultural Center - includes performance space, managed by SOMArts; 934 Brannan Street
Stage Werx Theatre - 446 Valencia Street Mission District theatre hosts love performances, comedy, solo performance, music, and movies 
Strand Theatre - new venue opened in 2015 owned by American Conservatory Theater; originally opened in 1917 and shuttered in 2003; across from UN Plaza 
Supperclub - 657 Harrison Street
Teatro ZinZanni - cirque, comedy, and cabaret theater, currently without a venue, but seeking to return to the San Francisco waterfront
Theatre 39 at Pier 39 - Beach Street at Embarcadero 
Theatre Makers - traveling theater company that performs plays and musicals with social, political, economic, and environmental change (SPEEC) themes
Tides Theatre - 99-seat theater at 533 Sutter Street, 2nd Floor, Union Square
TLF-theatre of Lycée Français of San Francisco - 325-seat theater at 1201 ortega street, Sunset 
Un-Scripted Theater Company - 49-seat improv theater at 533 Sutter Street, 2nd floor, Union Square 
Variety Preview Room Theatre - located in the Hobart building, 582 Market Street
Venetian Room at the Fairmont San Francisco - home of Bay Area Cabaret performances, and the venue where Tony Bennett first sang his signature song, "I Left My Heart in San Francisco"
Victoria Theatre- Mission District theater that presents locally produced original plays, live concerts, film festivals, musicals, performances by international performing companies and other kinds of events
Viracocha - formerly underground performance venue, now a licensed venue, at 998 Valencia Street in the Mission 
Walt Disney Family Museum Theater - Presidio Main Post
The Warfield - large historic music venue at 982 Market Street
Yerba Buena Center for the Arts - includes the Novelius/YBCA Theatre; 701 Mission Street
Yoshi's San Francisco - jazz club at 1330 Fillmore Street

Former theatres 
 Grand Opera House (San Francisco)
 Northpoint Theatre

Theatre gallery

See also
 Theatre Bay Area
 Theater District (San Francisco, California)
 Bay Area performing arts spaces

References

External links 
 
 
 
 
 

 01
Theatres
Theatres San Francisco
San Francisco
Culture of San Francisco